Bill Laing (born March 24, 1953) is a Canadian former professional ice hockey player who played in the World Hockey Association (WHA). Drafted in the fifth round of the 1973 NHL Amateur Draft by the St. Louis Blues, Laing opted to play in the WHA after being selected by the Alberta Oilers in the fourth round of the 1973 WHA Amateur Draft. He played parts of two WHA seasons for the Edmonton Oilers.
He is also the father of former professional hockey player Quintin Laing.  On January 23, 2019, Bill suited up for the Harris Slopuckers in Perdue, SK versus the Perdue Pirates and scored twice, making him the oldest Slopucker at age 65 with a multigoal game.

References

External links

1953 births
Canadian ice hockey centres
Edmonton Oilers (WHA) draft picks
Edmonton Oilers (WHA) players
Ice hockey people from Saskatchewan
Living people
Saskatoon Blades players
St. Louis Blues draft picks
Western International Hockey League players
Winston-Salem Polar Twins (SHL) players